Lukáš Volf (born July 28, 1995) is a Czech professional ice hockey player. He is currently playing for BK Mladá Boleslav of the Czech Extraliga.

Volf made his Czech Extraliga debut playing with BK Mladá Boleslav during the 2014-15 Czech Extraliga season.

References

External links

1995 births
Living people
BK Mladá Boleslav players
Czech ice hockey forwards
Sportspeople from Písek
VHK Vsetín players
HC Benátky nad Jizerou players
IHC Písek players